Metal powder is a metal that has been broken down into a powder form. Metals that can be found in powder form include aluminium powder, nickel powder, iron powder and many more. There are four different ways metals can be broken down into this powder form:

 Direct Reduction
 Gas Atomization
 Liquid Atomization
 Centrifugal Atomization

Processes 
The following processes can be used to produce metal powder:
 Direct reduction is the result of blending carbon with iron oxide ore, heating the mixture, removing the sponge iron from the carbon, grinding it, annealing it, and regrinding to make the powder form usable for manufacturing.
 Gas atomization occurs when a molten metal is passed through a passageway to a gas-filled chamber that cools the metal.  As it falls, it is collected and annealed into a powder.
 Liquid atomization is similar to gas atomization, but instead the metal is sprayed with high-pressure liquid which solidifies the droplets more rapidly. This results in the powder being more porous, smaller, and cleaner.
 Centrifugal atomization occurs when a metal is put into a chamber as a rod and electrically melted, at the end of the rod, to produce melted droplets that fall into another chamber and then solidify.

Types and Uses 

 Aluminum powder: Fireworks, metallic paints, manufacturing in solar cells in the green energy sector
 Bismuth powder: Production of batteries, welding rods, creating alloys
 Cadmium powder: Glazed used on ceramics, transparent conductors, nickel-cadmium batteries
 Iron powder: Magnetic products, printing, brake pads, certain types of dyes and stains
 Nickel powder: used for corrosion resistance, such as in the marine industry
 Raney nickel: used as a catalyst
 Platinum black: used as a catalyst
 Titanium powder

See also
Powder metallurgy
Pressing
Sintering

References

Metals
Metal